Kathrin Margrit Lehmann (born 27 February 1980) is a Swiss ice hockey forward. She most recently played with ESC Planegg of the Deutsche Fraueneishockey-Liga (DFEL) in the 2019–20 season.

International career
Lehmann was selected for the Switzerland national women's ice hockey team in the 2006 and 2010 Winter Olympics. In 2010, she served as captain, scoring two goals and six points. In 2006, she scored three goals and five points.

Lehmann has also appeared for Switzerland at ten IIHF Women's World Championships at two levels. Her first appearance came in 1997. She was a member of the bronze medal winning team at the 2012 championships.

Career statistics

International career

References

External links

1980 births
Living people
Ice hockey players at the 2006 Winter Olympics
Ice hockey players at the 2010 Winter Olympics
Olympic ice hockey players of Switzerland
Ice hockey people from Zürich
Swiss women's ice hockey forwards
AIK IF players